Eslamabad-e Ghani (also Romanized as Eslāmābād-e Ghanī) is a village in Bakhtajerd Rural District, in the Central District of Darab County, Fars Province, Iran. At the 2006 census, its population was 64, in 19 families.

References 

Populated places in Darab County